Vibidia is a crater on the asteroid 4 Vesta located at 26.9°S and 139.9°W. It has a diameter of 7.1 km. There is a distinctive ray-like pattern of bright and dark material, with the bright rays extending circularly for 15 km around Vibidia, and the dark rays mostly restricted to within the crater and on the rim. The rays cut across older craters, whereas a few younger craters have formed on top of them.

It was named after the Roman Vestal Virgin Vibidia on 27 December 2011.

References

Surface features of 4 Vesta
Impact craters on asteroids